Bonsu is a surname. Notable people with the surname include:

Badu Bonsu II (died 1838), Ghanaian king of the Ahanta
Mensa Bonsu (died 1896), Asantehene
Nana Osei Bonsu II (born 1939), Regent of the Ashanti Kingdom
Osei Bonsu (died 1824), Asantehene
Osei Kyei Mensah Bonsu (born 1957), Ghanaian urban planner and politician
Pops Mensah-Bonsu (born 1983), British basketball executive and former player
Randy Edwini-Bonsu (born 1990), Ghanaian-born Canadian soccer player
Solomon Antwi Kwaku Bonsu (born 1921), Ghanaian politician
Jackson Osei Bonsu, better known as Sugar Jackson (born 1981), Belgian boxer

Surnames of Akan origin